James R. Charneski (July 1, 1935 – March 15, 2019) is a former member of the Wisconsin State Assembly.

Biography
Charneski was born on July 1, 1935 in Green Bay, Wisconsin. He attended the University of Wisconsin–Green Bay, the University of Wisconsin–Platteville, the University of Wisconsin–Madison and the University of Wisconsin–Whitewater. He served in the United States Coast Guard from 1954 to 1958 and was stationed in the headquarters of the Seventh Coast Guard District in Miami, Florida. He also served in the Brown County, Wisconsin Sheriff's Department for 27 years. Charneski was married and had with four children.

Political career
Charneski was elected to the Assembly in a special election in 1987. Additionally, he served as Supervisor, Chairperson and Village President of Allouez, Wisconsin. He is a Republican.

References

1935 births
2019 deaths
Politicians from Green Bay, Wisconsin
Mayors of places in Wisconsin
Wisconsin city council members
Republican Party members of the Wisconsin State Assembly
Military personnel from Wisconsin
United States Coast Guard enlisted
University of Wisconsin–Green Bay alumni
University of Wisconsin–Platteville alumni
University of Wisconsin–Madison alumni
University of Wisconsin–Whitewater alumni
American deputy sheriffs